JEERK is a rhythm performance group from Sweden, which was formed in 2002. The founding members were Niklas Karlsson, Johan Regnell, Bo-Erik Eriksson, Michael Jansson and Johan Eriksson. The group's name, JEERK, was formed by using the first initial from the founding member's surname; e.g., Jansson, Eriksson, Eriksson, Regnell, Karlsson. After two months, Thomas Bergstig joined JEERK. Each member has attended either the Ballet Academy or the Performing Arts School in Göteborg.

JEERK writes and produces all of their material, e.g.: music, choreography, scripts, videos and graphics. JEERK is administered through two corporations: Greenhouse Production AB (Sweden) and DDFS Entertainment, Inc (USA).

JEERK specializes in visual music. They perform varied styles of dance, primarily tap dancing. The group features rhythms made by converting ordinary items (i.e., lunch boxes, hockey sticks, trash cans) into percussion instruments. The members of JEERK are all multi-instrumentalists and incorporate original songs within their performances.

Members
 Niklas "Nikke" Karlsson (2002–Present) -- Originally from Kungälv
 Johan "Reggie" Regnell (2002–Present) -- Originally from Linköping
 Bo-Erik "BoBo" Eriksson (2002–Present) -- Originally from Norrtälje
 Michael Jansson (2002–2005) -- Originally from Trollhättan
 Johan "Xet" Eriksson (2002–Present) -- Originally from Örebro
 Thomas "Tymac" Bergstig (2002–Present) -- Originally from Stockholm
 Fredrik Lexfors (2005–2006) -- Originally from Vinslöv
 Kristian Lindin (2012–Present) --Originally from Örebro
 Mikael Johansson (2012–Present) --Originally from Skattungbyn

Performance History

JEERK's first show was at Pusterviksteatern, Gothenburg, in 2002 with the group's first showcase in Skene, the same year. JEERK has performed in many venues, including: stage shows, as guest entertainers on television programs, at special events, festivals, as well as several product launches. JEERK has choreographed several numbers for guest performers at Sweden's Onstage Event, and to promote new products for companies. Lindab is one of JEERK’s most devout partners and provided the group with ventilation pipes for drums. Whenever Lindab quests to conquer a new market, JEERK helps out with their special talent for loud sound. JEERK has also composed rhythmic pieces of music for German CLAAS and Swedish SKF. The song Emergency was originally written for a commercial for the diaper brand Huggies.

The JEERK Show tour with Riksteatern, was JEERK's first full-length show which toured almost 40 cities around Sweden. JEERKs second full-length show, Overload sold out for four nights in a row during December, 2004.

JEERK’s TV-breakthrough was Sweden’s most popular TV-show, ”Allsång på Skansen”, in 2003, with millions of viewers every summer. In 2004, they appeared as special guests on Lill-Babs 50 år, a television show celebrating the career of the Swedish singer and actress. On the show, which had 1,730,000 viewers JEERK performed a version of the famous Beatles song, "Come Together".

In 2006, JEERK performed in the opening ceremony of the European Athletics Championship in Göteborg, an event which had "a total audience of 340 million over the seven days of the championships." Singer, Ronan Keating, famous for his rendition of When You Say Nothing at All, also performed during the Ceremony.

In the same year, JEERK appeared as guest performers at the Swedish Eurovision Song Contest, with approximately 3,645,000 viewers.

In 2007, the group performed on Let's Dance, Sweden's version of Dancing with the Stars, which had a viewership of over two million people.

In 2008, the group performed on the Romanian show Dansez pentru tine which means “Dancing for you” in an episode where the contestants as well as the guest artists performed for a cause. JEERK, in this particular case, performed for a girl who was not able to pay for her dance school.

In 2009, the group had their first US performance at the theme park Silver Dollar City, performing several shorter shows per day. After a successful 10-week run at the theme park, JEERK returned to the US in 2010 to perform for two years at the Hughes Brother's Theatre in Branson, MO. Following the second year's performances, JEERK began to pursue a European and US tour. The group is now based in the US, while performing both in the US and Europe.

Album Release

In May, 2012, JEERK released their first full-length Album, FAMOUS. FAMOUS consists of nine tracks, composed and written by members of the group. June 23, 2014, JEERK announced the release of a new single, Play Your Mind.

Showography

Show

 2004	 The JEERK Show tour with Riksteatern
 2004	 Overload Grand stage, Gothenburg Opera
 2006	 Rock´n´Rhythm Show Trädgår´n, Gothenburg
 2006	 JEERK Christmas Show Rörstrands Industries, Linköping
 2007	 JEERKmania	Sweden tour
 2007 	 The Best of JEERK Storan, Gothenburg and Nalen, Stockholm
 2009	 Theme Park Special	Silver Dollar City, Branson, Missouri
 2010	 The JEERK Show 2010 Hughes Brothers Theatre, Branson, Missouri
 JEERK won “Best Show Award”.
 2011	 The JEERK Show 2011 Hughes Brothers Theatre, Branson, Missouri
 2012  The JEERK Show 2012 Andy Williams Moon River Theatre, Branson, Missouri
 2012  The JEERK Show Dominican Republic tour 
 2013  The JEERK Show 2013 RFD-TV The Theatre, Branson, Missouri
 2013  The JEERK Show Wisconsin State Fair, West Allis, Wisconsin

TV

 2003	 Allsång på Skansen, SVT2
 2004	 Bingolotto, Performers, TV4
 2006	 European Athletics Championships opening ceremony, Eurosport
 2006	 Eurovision Song Contest, Guest performers, Scandinavium, SVT1
 2007	 Let’s Dance, Guest performers, TV4
 2007  Bingolotto, Performers, TV4
 2008	 Dansez Pentru Tine, Guest performers, ProTV, Romania

Event

 2002	Opening ceremony of Casino Cosmopol, Gothenburg
 2004	Carnegie Art Award, Honoring Nina Roos
 2006 	Opening ceremony of Kanyon Shopping Center, Istanbul
 2007	SKF 100th anniversary, feat. Neil Armstrong, Gothenburg
 2007	Lindab, product launch, Frankfurt
 2008 	Lindab, product launch, Basel
 2008 	Lindab, product launch, Milano
 2007	CLAAS, product launch Sweden, Mantorp
 2008	Opening ceremony of Bâneasa Shopping Center, Bucharest
 2011 Bilsport Awards, Stockholm
 2012 Volvo Product Launch, Gothenburg, Stockholm 
 2012 Pacific Life Conference, Huntington Beach
 2013 Guldkärnan, Helsingborg
 2014 Still/Moving UCMO, Warrensburg

Other

 2005	Onstage, Svenska Mässan, Gothenburg and Älvsjömässan, Stockholm
 2008	Danish-German Children's Theatre Festival, Flensburg & Haderslev
 2008	Onstage, Scandinavium, Gothenburg and The Globe, Stockholm

References

External links 
 
 
 

Swedish musical groups
Visual music artists
Musical groups established in 2002
2002 establishments in Sweden